Macormick Bay (alternate: McCormick Bay) is an Arctic waterway in Qikiqtaaluk Region, Nunavut, Canada. It lies off the southwestern coast of Devon Island in the eastern high Arctic. Like Baring Bay to the north, it is an arm of Wellington Channel.

It is named in honor of Dr. Robert McCormick, a British Royal Navy surgeon, explorer and naturalist who searched nearby for the missing Sir John Franklin expedition.

Geography
Macormick Bay's cliffs are characterized by Silurian limestone.

Snowblind Bay on Cornwallis Island, to the west, has similar red strata beds.

References

 Macormick Bay, Nunavut at Atlas of Canada

Bays of Qikiqtaaluk Region